The Ontario Northland Railway  is a Canadian railway operated by the Ontario Northland Transportation Commission, a provincial Crown agency of the government of Ontario.

Originally built to develop the Lake Timiskaming and Lake Nipissing areas, the railway soon became a major factor in the economic growth of the province. After decades of difficult construction through the Canadian Shield, workers reached James Bay in 1932. While blasting the route through the shield, geologists discovered deposits of valuable minerals such as gold, silver, copper and nickel. The railway also made it possible to exploit the timber resources of Northern Ontario.

There is one major branchline running eastward from Swastika through Kirkland Lake and over the Quebec border to end at Rouyn-Noranda. The railway's branch from Swastika to Rouyn-Noranda, including 40 kilometres of track in Quebec, is operated by a subsidiary, the Nipissing Central Railway.

Shorter spur lines also exist running west from Rock Junction to Sherman Mine, south-west from Porquis Junction to Kidd Creek Mine, about 22 km east of Timmins, north-east from Porquis to Iroquois Falls and south from Opaz Junction to Agrium mine site. Several other mining spurs opened and closed with the mines they served. Since 1993, the ON operates a section of the National Transcontinental Railway running west from Cochrane to Calstock.

History

James Bay Railway

The line was originally chartered as the Lake Nipissing And James Bay Railway in 1884. The original route ran roughly northward from Callander to Moose River on James Bay. However, in 1902, before construction started, the Canadian Northern Railway (CNoR) took over the charter and used it as the basis for a new line running northwest from Parry Sound to Sudbury, with an additional line running from Parry Sound south to Toronto. The section running south to Toronto opened on November 6, 1906. The northern section was completed in 1908, although by this time it had been rechartered as part of the Canadian Northern Ontario Railway (CNOR).

Temiskaming and Northern Ontario Railway (1902–46)
With the original plans having been dropped, and a railway on this route still desired, the new Temiskaming and Northern Ontario Railway was incorporated on 17 March 1902, by the Temiskaming and Northern Ontario Railway Act of the Ontario parliament. The railway was to be a provincial Crown corporation overseen by the Temiskaming and Northern Ontario Railway Commission. Construction on the railway started in 1903, and the settlement of Redwater in the municipality of Temagami began as a small request stop when the railway reached the area of the Lower and Upper Redwater Lakes.

As it passed by Long Lake, near the 103 mile marker, the largest silver rush in Canada was sparked by workers looking for trees for railway ties. The town of Cobalt grew out of the fortunes of silver taken from the grounds. By 1905, it reached New Liskeard in the Lake Timiskaming area. The railway reached Englehart in 1906 and Cochrane in 1909. In the next few years, several branch lines were built.

In 1921, construction on a line north to James Bay was started. In 1923, the new Conservative premier of Ontario, Howard Ferguson, halted further construction, saying that it would be unprofitable. For four years the terminus of the line remained at Fraserdale, near Abitibi Canyon, where the Abitibi Canyon Generating Station was being built on the Abitibi River. Between 1928 and 1930 the railway was extended north at a slow pace. The pace of construction was quickened in 1930 as a make-work project due to the depression. The extension to James Bay was opened on July 15, 1932. The terminus of the railway was at the mouth of the Moose River near the old trading post of Revillon Frères. It was named Moosonee, from the Cree meaning "at the moose".

A name change for the railway was first proposed in 1942 by Arthur Cavanagh, who was chairman of the commission between 1940 and 1944. He noted that it would have the advantage of associating the railway with the province, not just the District of Timiskaming. A name change would also avoid confusion with the Texas and New Orleans Railway, which had the same initials. The Ontario railway often had boxcars misdirected in the United States, while receiving invoices that should have gone to Texas. The railway's name was changed to the Ontario Northland Railway on April 5, 1946, when a bill amending the Temiskaming and Northern Ontario Railway Act received assent.

1946–2010

Three new mines were opened in Northern Ontario in the 1960s. Sherman Mine in Temagami was opened in 1968, Adams Mine in Kirkland Lake in 1963, and Kidd Creek Mine in Timmins in 1967. The Ontario Northland Railway built spurs to serve these mines.

In 1993, CN applied to abandon sections of its underused former National Transcontinental Railway mainline across northern Ontario (it had previously abandoned the portion of the line between Calstock and Nakina in 1988). The portion between Calstock and Cochrane was sold to ONR.

In December 2000, the Ontario government announced that it would be privatizing the railway. CN submitted a bid in March 2002, and in October the government gave it exclusive rights to negotiate a purchase of the railway. However, the deal fell through on July 2, 2003, over the government's insistence on job guarantees, and the railway remained in public hands. On February 25, 2005, CN and ONR signed a routing agreement in which ONR would transport CN's freight traffic between Noranda and either Hearst or North Bay.

On April 14, 2010, there was news of a proposed Ontario Northland takeover of the controversial Ottawa Valley rail tracks. However, this development never came to fruition.

Proposed divestment, end of the Northlander, restructuring (2012–2014)
On March 23, 2012, the Ontario government announced that it would begin to wind down the ONTC, citing increased costs to the government and stagnant ridership. ONR passenger train service between Toronto and Cochrane (the Northlander) was withdrawn and replaced with an augmented bus service, and all of the corporation's assets were to be sold off.  On August 16, the Ontario Government announced that Northlander train service would end on September 28, 2012, and Ontera will be sold off.

Northern Ontario municipal leaders had continued to express their fears regarding the divestment. They indicated that the ONR provides a fundamental link to many remote and rural communities and provides freight transport to many companies, including mining and forestry, allowing them to thrive.  They indicate that the government maintained its funding to the GO Transit network in Southern Ontario and it is important to not forget about the important service the ONR provides to Northern Ontario residents.  In February 2014, the new premier of Ontario, Kathleen Wynne, met with northern community leaders and the head of the company and union to discuss the future of the company. They decided the union and management would present a reconstruction plan to the government for consideration.

In late February 2014 a report to restructure the ONTC was delivered to the Minister of Northern Development and Mines.  The proposal detailed how the organization could be modernized both culturally and in job reductions through attrition.  The report was well received by the minister who appreciated how management and labour come together to explore options for the corporation.

In April 2014 the provincial government concluded the company would remain in public hands.  However, Ontera (its telecommunication division) would be sold off to Bell Aliant.  The government would reinvest in the company to purchase new coaches and refurbish rolling stock for the Polar Bear Express.  This decision was supported by other members of Provincial Parliament after the auditor general's review cited that it would have cost the taxpayer $820 million instead of saving $265.9 million over three years had the divestment proceeded.

Plans to resume passenger service
In May 2021, the provincial government announced  plans for Ontario Northland and Metrolinx to resume passenger operations between Toronto and northeastern Ontario with a 13-stop route to begin service by the mid-2020s. In November 2021, the decision was made to make the new terminus Timmins (previously Cochrane) due to its size and the fact that it serves as a regional transportation hub. A test run was conducted in March of 2021, and again in November of 2021 where several northern Ontario mayors, MPPs, and local residents were taken from North Bay to Toronto's Union station.

In December 2022, the provincial government announced that it would purchase 3 new train sets from Siemens Mobility Limited at a cost of $140million. Each train set would consist of a locomotive and three passenger cars. The train sets are for the restoration of Northlander train service between Toronto and Cochrane, which would operate four to seven times per week depending on season. There would be 16 stops: Toronto (Union Station), Langstaff, Gormley, Washago, Gravenhurst, Bracebridge, Huntsville, South River, North Bay, Temagami, Temiskaming Shores, Englehart, Kirkland Lake/Swastika, Matheson, Timmins and Cochrane.

Passenger trains

ONR operated the following passenger services:
 the Northlander from Cochrane to Toronto, 6 days per week, year-round. The Ontario Liberal Government announced plans to discontinue the Northlander and replace it with bus service. The final train ran on September 28, 2012.
 the Polar Bear Express from Cochrane to Moosonee, 5 days per week, year-round, and 6 days per week in the summer. This is a flag stop train.  The Ontario government has stated its intention to preserve this service even as the ONTC winds down, saying that it will "develop ... a new model to provide ongoing support for essential transportation services, such as the Polar Bear Express."
 the Dream Catcher Express from North Bay to Temagami, an early fall excursion service. This service ended in 2012.

In June 2007 the Polar Bear Express was expanded from a seasonal excursion service to a year-round passenger train, replacing the Little Bear mixed freight/passenger train, which had operated 3 days per week. The new train carries some equipment not commonly found on passenger trains, including chain cars (flat cars) for passenger vehicles and boxcars.

In April 2022 the Ontario Government announced that it would invest $75-million (CAD), into infrastructure and towards resuming service between Toronto and Timmins.

Freight services

Connections with other railway systems are made as follows:
 North Bay (CN and Ottawa Valley Railway, which connects to CP)
 Hearst (Algoma Central Railway)
 Rouyn-Noranda (CN)

There are a series of regular runs including:
North Bay to Cochrane – Weekdays
North Bay to Timmins (Hallnor) – Weekdays
North Bay to Rouyn, QC – Daily (except Saturday)
Cochrane to Hearst – Weekdays
Cochrane to Moosonee – Tuesday and Friday
Hearst to Agrium Mine Site – Daily

Locomotives and rolling stock

The railway currently owns about 25 diesel locomotives and roughly 700 items of rolling stock. One of its more unusual pieces of rolling stock is a canoe car, which is in service in the summer as part of the Polar Bear Express passenger train. The car can hold up to 18 canoes. Canoeists can put canoes on this car as part of their baggage, although canoes are often stowed in boxcars. It is the only known train car specifically designed for transporting canoes and kayaks.

In 1977, the railway purchased four RAm/DE train sets retired from the Trans Europ Express by the Dutch and Swiss railways, for use on its Northlander train. However, the experiment was not entirely successful. The locomotives were scrapped in 1984, although the passenger cars survived until the early 1990s. These surviving passenger cars were pulled by rebuilt Canadian locomotives (EMD FP7). The rear end of the locomotives was altered to fit to original cars. With the Canadian locomotives, the control car / DVT lost their function.

Many passenger cars used on ONR trains today are former single-level GO Transit cars that were extensively refurbished after being used for commuter service around Toronto.

In 2004, Ontario Northland purchased ten passenger cars, including dome cars, from BC Rail and has used some of them on the Polar Bear Express service between Cochrane and Moosonee.

 Highball steam engine – ex-Temiskaming & Northern Ontario  (later as 219) built in 1907 and Normetal 1938, then acquired by ONR in 1975 and sold to Northern Ontario Railway Museum
 4-6-2 steam engine – stored in Englehart
 Electro-Motive Diesel (EMD) F7B
 General Motors Diesel (GMD) FP7
 GMD GP9
 GMD GP38-2
 GMD GP40-2
 GMD SD40-2
 GMD SD75I
 EMD F40PH converted to Auxiliary Power Control Units (APCU)
 Montreal Locomotive Works
 MLW RS-10
 MLW RS-2
 MLW RS-3
 MLW S-4
 MLW S-2
 American Locomotive Company (Alco) RS-2
 Hawker Siddeley Canada corrugated coach – single deck coach acquired from GO Transit
 PM-class coach
 Budd dome coach
 Budd lounge car
 Budd lunch counter car
 Werkspoor/Schweizerische Industrie Gesellschaft TEE Trainset (No longer on roster, some cars have been shipped back to Europe, currently based in the Netherlands)

Facilities

 North Bay Yard – located on the west side of the ONR Head Office and stores most of the ONR's cars. Ontario Northland's Refurbishment Division at the yard was contracted by GO Transit to overhaul some bilevel cars.
 Cochrane Yard – a small yard located next to Cochrane station at 3rd Avenue and 2nd Street (not the larger one to the east). Also site of ONR Freight Services.
 Temagami Work Shed – located north of the Temagami Station (1907) to handle freight
 Moosonee Yard – small yard to store box/rail cars and diesel locomotives, diesel shed
 Hearst Yard – a small yard located in the core of the city

See also

 Ontario Northland Motor Coach Services
 Canadian National Railway
 Canadian Pacific Railway
 List of Ontario railways
 Rail transport in Ontario

References

Further reading

External links

 
 ONR Gallery Photos and Articles
 Ontario Northland in Moosonee
 Ontario Northland Railways Historical and Technical Society

 
Ontario railways
Passenger railways in Ontario
Railway
Companies based in North Bay, Ontario
Rail transport in North Bay, Ontario
Rail transport in Cochrane District
Rail transport in Timiskaming District
Railway companies established in 1902
1902 establishments in Ontario
Standard gauge railways in Canada